Buffers and chain couplers (also known as "buffers and screw", "screw", "screwlink", and "English" couplers) are the de facto UIC standard railway stock coupling used in the EU and UK, and on some surviving former colonial railways, such as in South America and India, on older rolling stock. Buffers and chain couplers are an assembly of several devices: buffers, hooks and links, or turnbuckle screws.

On the modern version of the couplers, rail vehicles are mated by manually connecting the end link of one chain which incorporates a turnbuckle screw into the towing hook of the other wagon, drawing together and slightly compressing the buffer pairs, one left and one right on each headstock.  That limits slack, and lessens shunting shocks in moving trains. By contrast, vehicles fitted with the semi-automatic Janney Type E coupler can experience significant jarring during mating and shunting. Very early rolling stock had "dummy buffers", which were simple rigid extensions of the frame, but they were improved with the use of enclosed mechanical, then hydraulic, springs to damp possible jarring. Each chain incorporates both a hook and a turnbuckle.

Characteristics

The standard type of coupling on railways following the British tradition is the buffer and chain coupling used on the pioneering Planet class locomotive of the Liverpool and Manchester Railway of 1830. Those couplings followed earlier plateway or wagonway practice, but were made more regular.

The buffers and chain coupling is still the standard in European countries, except for the former Soviet Union, where the SA-3 automatic coupler is used.  Coupling is done by a worker who must climb between the cars, who winds the turnbuckle to the loose position, and then hangs the chain on the hook. After that, the turnbuckle handle is stowed on the idle hook to prevent damage to itself, the vehicle, or the brake pipes. A dangling chain is only permitted during shunting. Disconnected brake pipes must be stowed on dummy connectors, to allow proper operation of the brakes. (The picture shows two coupled cars, with a single brake pipe.)

The hooks and chain hold the carriages together, while the buffers keep the carriages from banging into each other so that no damage is caused. The buffers can be "dumb" or spring-loaded. That means there are no run-in forces on the coupler. The other benefit compared with automatic couplers is that its lesser slack causes smaller forces on curves, so there is less probability of a broken coupler on a curve than with automatic couplers. The disadvantage is the smaller mass of the freight that can be hauled by hook and chain couplers, the maximum being .

Early rolling stock was often fitted with a pair of auxiliary chains as a backup if the main coupling failed. That made sense before the fitting of continuous fail-safe braking systems.

On railways where rolling stock always pointed the same way, the chain might be mounted at one end only, as a small cost and weight saving measure.

On German and Scandinavian railways, the left buffer is flatter than the slightly more rounded right one, which provides better contact between the buffers than would be the case if both buffers were slightly rounded.

Variants

Three-link couplings 

A peculiarly British practice was the "loose-coupled" freight train, operated by the locomotive crew and a "guard" at the rear of the train, the successor to the brakesman of earlier times.  That train type used three-link chain couplings for traction and side buffers to accept pushing forces but, since such trains were not fitted with an automatic through-train braking system, there were no pipes to connect between the vehicles.  The last vehicle of the train was a heavily ballasted guard's van with its brakes controllable by a handwheel operated by the guard. The slack between vehicles was very convenient when starting heavy trains with a relatively low-powered locomotive on the level or on a rising gradient.

On the driver's command the guard would apply his brake as hard as possible. The driver would then gently reverse to close up the wagons onto their buffers. Then the  locomotive was driven ahead, picking up the load wagon by wagon, thus giving an easy start up the gradient. Wagons of that era didn't have roller bearings and the grease-lubricated plain bearings exerted considerable resistance, especially on a cold day, so starting wagon-by-wagon greatly reduced the traction force required from the locomotive. 

The disadvantage of that convenience was that the guard could get badly thrown about as the train changed speed due to the inter-wagon gaps opening or closing. In the worst case, the jerks could break a coupling or cause a derailment. A skilled guard would observe or listen to his train and apply or release his brake to keep the last few couplings reasonably taut, acting as a shock-absorber. The same effect occurred when the route changed gradient. When going over a hill the rear of the train would catch up with the wagons held back by the locomotive, but the guard could minimise that. That method of train working was why the guard, just like the driver, was required to prove his route knowledge before being given charge of a heavy train. Loose-coupled trains travelled at low speeds and were phased out in the 1970s.

An improvement on the loose-coupled train is the "Instanter" coupling, in which the middle link of a three-link chain is specially triangular shaped, so that when lying "prone" it provides enough slack to make coupling possible, but when the middle link is rotated 90 degrees, the length of the chain is effectively shortened, reducing the amount of slack without the need to wind a screw.  The closeness of the coupling allows the use of inter-vehicle pipes for train brakes. Three-link and Instanter couplings can be operated entirely from the side of the wagons, using a shunter's pole, which has a hook on the end, and is safer when shunting is being done. Similarly, the screw-adjustable coupler can be connected by a shunter's pole once it has been unscrewed. Ordinary three-link couplings have been superseded by instanter, screw or buck-eye couplers in UK freight trains today.

Center-buffer-and-chain(s) 

On some narrow-gauge lines in Europe, and on the Paris Metro, a simplified version of the loose-coupler is used, consisting of a single central buffer with a chain underneath. Sometimes there are two chains, one on each side of the coupler. The chain usually contains a screw-adjustable link to allow close coupling. These variants are also used elsewhere. On sharp curves, a single centre buffer is less likely to be subject to buffer-locking. The  Eritrean Railway also uses a centre buffer and chain coupler.

Buffer-and-chain on narrow gauge railways 
Buffer-and-chain couplers are not suitable on lines with very sharp curves, because there is a buffer-locking problem if pushing the limit. Because of that, and because of Carl Pihl's successful promotion of the single-buffer Norwegian coupler that he designed to overcome the problem, conventional buffers-and-chain coupling is rarely employed on narrow-gauge systems, notable exceptions being the railway networks of Senegal/Mali, Tunisia and Côte d'Ivoire/Burkina Faso in Africa, and Queensland and Tasmania in Australia. Narrow gauge railways are often isolated from other railways, so standardization is not as important.

Problems with buffers and chain

Maximum load 
The buffers and chain coupling accommodates much lower maximum load than that of the Janney coupler.

Buffer-locking

On sharp reverse curves, the buffers can get buffer-locked by slipping over, and onto the back of, an adjacent buffer. Although careful track design makes that a rare occurrence, a series of derailments in the Stuttgart main station in 2012 were caused by buffer-locked wagons. Buffer-lock could occur on very sharp switches on rolling stock with the older, rounded buffers. The newer buffers are rectangular and are wider than they are tall. They are not as flat, so they rarely suffer from buffer-locking. Buffers and chain couplers allow curves to have around  radius, but sharp S-curves are not allowed. If it weren't for the couplers, much sharper curves could be allowed, on the condition the train is not too long.

Variation with gauge 
The width between the buffers tends to increase as the track gauge increases and decrease as the track gauge decreases, which means that if wagons are changed from one gauge to another, the buffers might no longer match. That is because the buffers are originally extensions of the frames, which are spaced according to the gauge of the track. As well, the height of the buffers is usually lower on narrow gauge railways, corresponding to the generally lower height of the rolling stock. Therefore, narrow gauge railways often use centre couplers without buffers.

However, in the case of Iberian broad gauge railways, the height and spacing of the buffers are the same as for standard gauge railways in Europe including Great Britain, in order to allow through-running of rolling stock by the use of bogie exchange.

Dimensions 
Buffers and chain couplers tend to have the two buffers spaced according to the gauge, but especially in Europe this is modified to the standard gauge value to allow interrunning by means of bogie exchange.

Dimensions showing variation of spacing by gauge.

Gallery

See also 
 Gangway connection
 Railway coupling
 Railway coupling by country

References

External links 
 
 Buffer and chain coupling

Couplers